Phalanta philiberti is a butterfly in the family Nymphalidae. It is found on the Seychelles, where it has not been collected since 1953.

References

Vagrantini
Butterflies described in 1893